Nicki Rapp (born September 4, 1972), often credited as Nikki Rapp, is an American voice actress known for providing the voices for Lili Zanotto in Psychonauts, Morgan LeFlay in Tales of Monkey Island, Lilly in The Walking Dead video game, and the children in several games in The Sims franchise.

Career
Rapp grew up in Santa Rosa, California and attended the American Academy of Dramatic Arts, where she studied theater. At the advice of one of her instructors, she began taking classes in voice acting, landing parts as children and toys.

Her first paid job as a voice actor was in 1999, and in 2003 she was cast to provide voices for children for The Sims franchise. Rapp was cast as Lili in the 2005 game Psychonauts. She was also the voice actress of the character Jun Wang in ObsCure II. She was cast to provide the voice of Morgan LeFlay in the 2009 title Tales of Monkey Island, developed by Telltale Games. Telltale Games cast Rapp in a second game, Sam & Max: The Devil's Playhouse, where she provided the voices of Sammun-Mak and Sam Jr., a cockroach. Rapp also provided the voice for Lilly in the 2012 game The Walking Dead, her third casting by Telltale Games. She reprised the role in The Walking Dead: The Final Season.

Role

References

External links
 
 
 
 
 
 
 
 

1972 births
Living people
American voice actresses
American video game actresses
People from Santa Rosa, California
American Academy of Dramatic Arts alumni
20th-century American actresses
21st-century American actresses